Burma competed at the 1980 Summer Olympics in Moscow, USSR. The South Asian nation returned the Olympic Games after boycotting the 1976 Summer Olympics.

Athletics

Men
Track & road events

Weightlifting

Men

References

Nations at the 1980 Summer Olympics
1980
1980 in Burmese sport